Kallum is a given name. Notable people with the name include:

Kallum Higginbotham (born 1989), British footballer
Kallum Mantack (born 1998), British footballer
Kallum Watkins (1991), British rugby league footballer

See also

Callum
Kallu (name)